Slalom is a business and technology consulting firm headquartered in Seattle, Washington. The company, which is a division of Slalom, Inc, employs more than 13,000 people in 43 markets and 16 Build Centers across North America, Europe, and Asia Pacific. Slalom's annual revenue exceeds two billion dollars.

History 
The company that is incorporated today as Slalom, Inc was formed in Denver, Colorado, as Accounting Quest, LLC in 1993. It began as a team that helped place permanent and temporary accounting and finance professionals to clients in the Denver area. In 1995, the company opened its Seattle office and focused on permanent placements and contract resources. The name was then changed to Two Degrees, LLC.
In 2010, the company rebranded and formally changed their name to Slalom, LLC.

Awards and recognition
Slalom has been named a best company to work for by numerous sources such as Forbes Magazine, Fortune Magazine, Consulting Magazine, Glassdoor, and various business journals and news publications in 2015, 2016, 2017, 2018, 2019, 2020, 2021, and 2022  and was recognized by the Human Rights Campaign's Corporate Equality Index with a perfect score of 100 five years in a row. Fortune Magazine has also recognized Slalom as a Best Workplace for Women from 2017 - 2022.

References

External links 
 

Management consulting firms of the United States
Information technology consulting firms of the United States
Companies based in Seattle
Consulting firms established in 2001
2001 establishments in Washington (state)